USNS Colonel William J. O’Brien (T-AK-246) was a US Maritime Administration (MARCOM) C1-M-AV1 type coastal cargo ship, originally planned as an . Constructed as Maiden's Eye for the MARCOM, completed in August 1945 and placed in operation by the War Shipping Administration (WSA). After the war Maiden's Eye was transferred to the US Army and renamed USAT Colonel William J. O’Brien who kept her in service until transferred to the US Navy in 1950 for operation as USNS Colonel William J. O’Brien (T-AK-246) by the Military Sea Transportation Service (MSTS) until 1973.

Construction
The ship was laid down as Maiden's Eye, one of the "Knot" ships named for a type of splice, on 17 January 1945 and launched, sponsored by Mrs. Thomas S. Middleton, on 13 February 1945 at Consolidated Steel Corporation, Long Beach, California, as a type (C1-M-AV1) under MARCOM contract, MC hull 2323. She was acquired by the US War Shipping Administration (WSA) on 10 April 1945 with operation by Grace Line as WSA's agent.

US military service
On 11 July 1946,  Maiden's Eye was assigned to the U.S. Army under bareboat charter for operation as USAT Colonel William J. O'Brien until transferred to the US Navy 1 March 1950. The Army name was retained with the ship immediately transferred to the MSTS as USNS Colonel William J. O’Brien (T-AK-246) for permanent assignment. USNS Colonel William J. O’Brien was stricken from the Navy List on 1 September 1973.

Disposition
Title was returned to the Maritime Administration (MARAD) on 9 November 1973 with sale to B. V. Intershitra of the Netherlands for $223,550 for scrapping.

Notes 

Citations

Bibliography 

Online resources

External links

 

Type C1-M ships
Ships built in Los Angeles
1945 ships
Merchant ships of the United States
Type C1-M ships of the United States Army
Alamosa-class cargo ships